The 1996 Metro-Dade County mayoral election took place on September 1, 1996. It was the first election in the Metro Dade County area (now Miami-Dade County) since the election of Stephen P. Clark. The election pitted various well-known and popular figures in the Miami-Dade area. Maurice Ferre and Xavier Suarez (both former Mayors of Miami) and former rivals in the 1987 Miami Mayor race, Arthur Teele (a wealthy African-American County Commissioner) and young former Hialeah City Councilman Alex Penelas along with several other minor candidates. County Commissioners Arthur Teele and Alex Penelas went on to the run-off. Penelas's victory made him the first Cuban-American mayor in Dade County and as of 2020, the only Democrat Cuban-American. Penelas also has the distinction of being the youngest mayor elected in Miami Dade County history at the age of 34. Arthur Teele was the first African American man to run for Dade County mayor.

Candidates 
 Alex Penelas, Incumbent County Commissioner and former Hialeah City Councilman
 Arthur Teele, Incumbent County Commissioner and former Head of the Urban Mass Transportation Administration
 Maurice Ferre, Incumbent County Commissioner and former Mayor of Miami
 Xavier Suarez, former Mayor of Miami
 William Perry 
 Charles F Knapp Jr, candidate for Metro-Dade County Commission, District 8
 Clennon W King, perennial candidate, candidate for Metro-Dade County Commission, District 3
 Rachele Fruit, perennial candidate and Communist activist
 Juan Miguel Alfonso, candidate for Hialeah city council and Hialeah mayor
 Manny Gonzalez-Goenaga 
 Dori De Falc

First round election results

References 

Mayoral elections
Miami-Dade County, Florida
Metro-Dade County